What Jamie Saw is a 1995 novel by Carolyn Coman.

Having fled with his mother and baby sister to a family friend's hillside trailer, nine-year-old Jamie Beauville lives an existence full of uncertainty and fear. He'd left home after his mother's boyfriend Van tried to throw Nin against a wall. Jamie will do anything to protect Nin. But if Van comes looking for him, he fears everything in his life will tailspin down to a point of no return.

In 1996 the novel won a Newbery Honor and was among the finalists for the National Book Award.

References

1995 American novels
Newbery Honor-winning works
American young adult novels
1995 children's books